Irene Coates (née Gregory; 23 March 1925 - 18 June 2019) was an English playwright, poet, painter, feminist and environmentalist. She is the author of 14 plays and four books, perhaps best known is her biography Who's Afraid of Leonard Woolf?: A Case for the Sanity of Virginia Woolf.

Biography
Irene Coates grew up in a bohemian family in London on the fringe of the Bloomsbury Group. In the 1940s she ran the Cambridge Drama Centre. She wrote 14 plays between 1961–81, which were produced among others by the Royal Shakespeare Company and performed at the Edinburgh Festival. She migrated to Australia in 1982 and was Writer in Residence (drama) at Nepean in 1998. She was the sister-in-law and aunt respectively of the painters Ivon Hitchens and John Hitchens.

Works

Books
Who's Afraid of Leonard Woolf?: A Case for the Sanity of Virginia Woolf

Plays
 The Wideawakes, Aldwych Theatre, 1965
 The Space is Mine (100 minutes) 
 Self Service (40 minutes)

Filmography
Irene Coates on Seeing

References

1925 births
2019 deaths
20th-century English dramatists and playwrights
People from Chichester
English women dramatists and playwrights
20th-century English women writers
English emigrants to Australia